Javier Ignacio Leon Mira (born March 23, 1982 in Córdoba, Argentina) is an Argentine central defender, with a lot of experiencie playing around the world currently with no club.

External links
 Profile at BDFA 
 

1982 births
Living people
Argentine footballers
Argentine expatriate footballers
Unión Huaral footballers
Club Real Potosí players
Tacuarembó F.C. players
Cobresal footballers
Vasalunds IF players
FC Atyrau players
Expatriate footballers in Chile
Expatriate footballers in Peru
Expatriate footballers in Bolivia
Expatriate footballers in Uruguay
Expatriate footballers in Sweden
Expatriate footballers in Kazakhstan
Association football defenders
Footballers from Córdoba, Argentina
Argentine expatriate sportspeople in Kazakhstan
Argentine expatriate sportspeople in Chile
Argentine expatriate sportspeople in Peru
Argentine expatriate sportspeople in Bolivia
Argentine expatriate sportspeople in Sweden
Argentine expatriate sportspeople in Uruguay